Ceratophyllus is a widespread genus of fleas found in temperate climates. Some of its members include the chicken flea, Ceratophyllus gallinae, and the poultry flea, Ceratophyllus niger.

Species

 Ceratophyllus adustus Jordan, 1932
 Ceratophyllus affinis Nordberg, 1935 
 Ceratophyllus altus Tipton et Mendez, 1966
 Ceratophyllus arcuegens Holland, 1952
 Ceratophyllus avicitelli Ioff, 1946
 Ceratophyllus borealis Rothschild, 1907
 Ceratophyllus breviprojectus Liu, Wu et Wu, 1966
 Ceratophyllus calderwoodi Holland, 1979
 Ceratophyllus caliotes Jordan, 1937
 Ceratophyllus celsus Jordan, 1926
 Ceratophyllus chasteli Beaucournu, Monnat et Launay, 1982
 Ceratophyllus chutsaensis Liu Lienchu et Wu Houyong, 1962
 Ceratophyllus ciliatus Baker, 1904
 Ceratophyllus coahuilensis Eads, 1956
 Ceratophyllus columbae Gervais, 1844
 Ceratophyllus delichoni Nordberg, 1935
 Ceratophyllus diffinis Jordan, 1925
 Ceratophyllus enefdeae Ioff, 1950
 Ceratophyllus farreni Rothschild, 1905
 Ceratophyllus fionnus Usher, 1968
 Ceratophyllus frigoris Darskaya, 1950
 Ceratophyllus fringillae Walker, 1856
 Ceratophyllus gallinae (Schrank, 1803)
 Ceratophyllus garei Rothschild, 1902
 Ceratophyllus gilvus Jordan et Rothschild, 1922
 Ceratophyllus hagoromo Jameson et Sakaguti, 1959
 Ceratophyllus hirundinis Curtis, 1826
 Ceratophyllus idius Jordan et Rothschild, 1922
 Ceratophyllus igii Darskaya et Shiranovich, 1971
 Ceratophyllus lari Holland, 1951
 Ceratophyllus liae Wu Wenzhen et Li Chao, 1990
 Ceratophyllus lunatus Jordan et Rothschild, 1920
 Ceratophyllus maculatus Wagner, 1927
 Ceratophyllus nanshanensis Tsai Liyuen, Pan Fenchun et Liu Chuan, 1980
 Ceratophyllus niger Fox, 1908
 Ceratophyllus olsufjevi Scalon et Violovich, 1961
 Ceratophyllus orites Jordan, 1937
 Ceratophyllus pelecani Augustson, 1932
 Ceratophyllus petrochelidoni Wagner, 1936
 Ceratophyllus phrillinae Smit, 1976
 Ceratophyllus picatilis Cai Liyun et Wu Wenzhen, 1988
 Ceratophyllus pullatus Jordan et Rothschild, 1920
 Ceratophyllus qinghaiensis Zhang Guangdeng et Ma Liming, 1985
 Ceratophyllus rauschi Holland, 1960
 Ceratophyllus rossittensis Dampf, 1913
 Ceratophyllus rusticus Wagner, 1903
 Ceratophyllus sclerapicalis Tsai Liyuen, Wu Wenching et Liu Chiying, 1974
 Ceratophyllus scopulorum Holland, 1952
 Ceratophyllus sinicus Jordan, 1932
 Ceratophyllus spinosus Wagner, 1903
 Ceratophyllus styx Rothschild, 1900
 Ceratophyllus titicacensis Boheman, 1866
 Ceratophyllus tribulis Jordan, 1926
 Ceratophyllus vagabundus Jordan, 1926
 Ceratophyllus wui Wang et Liu, 1996
 Ceratophyllus zhovtyi Emel'yanova et Goncharov, 1966

References 

Ceratophyllidae
Parasites of birds
Siphonaptera genera